Wendy Bell is a Scottish and British curler who competed in Curling at the 1992 Winter Olympics when it was a demonstration sport. She played for Scotland at the 1992 and 1999 World Curling Championships.

References

External links

1968 births
Living people
Scottish female curlers
Olympic curlers of Great Britain
Curlers at the 1992 Winter Olympics